Wyoming City Schools is a school district that serves the city of Wyoming, Ohio along with parts of Springfield Township, in the Cincinnati metropolitan area. The district serves students in grades Kindergarten through twelfth grades on 5 separate campuses, all located in the city limits of Wyoming.

Schools

High School
 Wyoming High School

Middle School
 Wyoming Middle School

Primary Schools
 Elm Elementary School
 Hilltop Elementary School 
 Vermont Elementary School

Culture 
The cultural focus in Wyoming is largely based around community and school support. The district offers many opportunities for students of all ages. Community involvement and school pride are important in Wyoming and a major reason why the Wyoming City School district is rated among the top districts in Ohio.

References

External links
 
 

Education in Hamilton County, Ohio
School districts in Ohio